Takumu (written: 拓夢) is a masculine Japanese given name. Notable people with the name include:

, Japanese footballer
, Japanese footballer
, Japanese baseball infielder 
, Japanese footballer 

Japanese masculine given names